The BSA Ultra is a popular, precharged pneumatic air rifle manufactured by a subsidiary of Spanish manufacturer Gamo, BSA Guns (UK) Limited and sold worldwide. Widely used for both sport and hunting it has proven itself to be both accurate and reliable. It is an unregulated, pneumatic powered air gun available in both .177 and .22 calibres and with a choice of either single shot or multi-shot. It is one of the cheapest PCP air rifles available in the market. It was designed by  BSA designer John Bowkett.

Features
The gun has a spring-assisted loading bolt, a match-accuracy barrel and a fully chequered stock. It comes equipped with scope mounts and silencer. Stocks in Beech and Walnut available as is a black synthetic stock. It is designed to be a lightweight stalking gun used for hunting vermin like rats and pigeons in cramped areas. It provides a two-stage, adjustable, match grade trigger which can be adjusted to provide a light pull weight. It has a manual safety to avoid accidental discharge.

Unlike most other pneumatic air rifles that use the traditional bolt action system, the Ultra features a unique Micro-Movement Cocking (MMC) System for loading. The MMC is operated by means of a plunger at the fore end of the stock. In the UK, it is also available in FAC versions requiring a firearms licence.

Shot count
The Ultra has an unregulated power supply. Therefore, pellet speeds vary according to the pressure of the cylinder. The Ultra is equipped with a small cylinder, thereby providing very low shot count compared to other pneumatic rifles. It provides about 40 shots/fill in .22 when cylinder is set to 200 bar. The count is 35 shots/fill in .177 when cylinder is set to 232 bar. The lower shot count in .177 is because .177 pellets travel at higher speeds than .22 and hence more 'charge' is required to power them. It is now possible to get after-market pressure regulators fitted to Ultra's which give up to 100 full power (12 ft pound) on one charge.

Multi-shot version
The Ultra is also available in multi-shot version. This uses the BSA standard 10-shot rotary magazine. The MMC system allows the shooter to reload the rifle without taking the eyes or the rifle off target, thereby allowing the shooter quick follow-up shots.

Drawbacks
In the UK it is a standard practice to replace the BSA moderators with Weihrauch or Logun silencers to reduce the rifle's report. Separate after market fitments for regulators and bigger cylinders are available. The MMC action also did not enable the shooter to keep on target as the switch to release the probe was under the nose, then the probe would come out in a position behind the shooter's ear. Then the probe would have to be pressed in if using a multishot (not allowed when engaged in target shooting competitions) or a pellet rolled into the breech, then the MMC would have to be pulled back, lifting the barrel. Also, if the shooter wanted a bipod the best way was to put it on backwards so that the legs when folded point towards the trigger.

It became popular to replace the BSA Scorpion barrel with that from an Ultra, leading to the "Scultra" and inspiring the design of the Ultra SE.

"Ultra SE"
The latest version (Ultra SE) features BSA's redesigned magazine, which boasts improved reliability over the previous model. The two-stage multi-shot system (MMC) has been replaced with a traditional bolt action assembly that increases the reload speed, and makes fitting and using a bipod considerably easier (due to the removal of the front plunger style cocking system). The hammer/valve assembly has been changed to a new 'Fast Strike' design which is claimed to increase consistency and shot count by around 20%. The factory fitted sound moderator has been replaced with a muzzle brake. The safety has been moved from the right to left hand side so as to not interfere with the bolt action. A pressure gauge is now present on the underneath of the stock, which enables the user to see how much charge is in the rifle.

See also
 Gamo
 List of air guns

External links
 BSA website

Air guns of the United Kingdom